Alexander (Smbat) Abian (January 1, 1923 – July 24, 1999) was an Iranian-born Armenian-American mathematician who taught for over 25 years at Iowa State University and became notable for his frequent posts to various Usenet newsgroups, and his advocacy for the destruction of the moon.

Life
Abian was born in Tabriz, Iran, and was of Armenian ethnicity. After earning an undergraduate degree in Iran, he emigrated to the United States in 1950, where he received a master's degree from the University of Chicago. Abian then obtained a Ph.D. from the University of Cincinnati, where he wrote a dissertation on a topic in invariant theory under the direction of Isaac Barnett. After teaching posts in Tennessee, New York, Pennsylvania, and Ohio, he joined the faculty of Iowa State in 1967. He wrote three books and published more than two hundred papers. He retired in 1993.

Moonless Earth theory
Abian gained a degree of international notoriety for his claim that blowing up the Moon would end virtually every natural disaster. He made this claim in 1991 in a campus newspaper, stating that a Moonless Earth wouldn't wobble, eliminating both the seasons and its associated events like heat waves, snowstorms and hurricanes. Abian said that "Those critics who say 'Dismiss Abian's ideas' are very close to those who dismissed Galileo."

The proposed nuclear destruction of the Moon has been rejected by astronomers on several grounds: the nuclear arsenal of mankind would fail to do more than crack the Moon's crust; if successful, the heating of Earth's atmosphere by a hail of falling lunar debris would be destructive to all life; and an increase, not decrease, in the Earth's wobble without a stabilizing Moon, leading to an Earth axial tilt of 45 degrees and more drastic seasons would occur.

Books
1965. 
1971. 
1976.

See also
Usenet personality

References

External links
 Alexander (Smbat) Abian  at the Mathematics Genealogy Project
 
 Author profile in the database zbMATH

1923 births
1999 deaths
20th-century American mathematicians
Iranian people of Armenian descent
American people of Armenian descent
Iowa State University faculty
Iranian emigrants to the United States
People from Tabriz
University of Chicago alumni
University of Cincinnati alumni
Usenet people